Andrew Fenton Cooper is a professor of political science at the University of Waterloo, in Waterloo, Ontario, in Canada. He also teaches at the Balsillie School of International Affairs, also in Waterloo, and was a fellow of the Centre for International Governance Innovation on the same campus.

He is the author of The BRICS: A Very Short Introduction, in the Very Short Introductions series published by the Oxford University Press, and was the lead editor of The Oxford Handbook of Modern Diplomacy, published by the same press in 2015.

References 

Living people
Canadian political scientists
Academic staff of the University of Waterloo
Scholars of diplomacy
Year of birth missing (living people)